InSpectres is a humorous paranormal investigation-themed role-playing game created by Jared Sorensen and independently published by Memento Mori Theatricks.The game's story line follows the player's work in a supernatural investigation and elimination company.

History
InSpectres is a humorous role-playing game by Jared Sorensen about ghost-busting.

Jay Little listed InSpectres as one of several narrative driven games that influenced his work as designer of the third edition of Warhammer Fantasy Roleplay (2009).

System 

InSpectres is written as a solution to the problems in classic whodunit role-playing games. In any kind of investigative adventure, the players follows a series of clues provided by the game master, which eventually enables the players to find out what happened and "who done it".  Managing the injection of clues into such a game can be quite difficult; if the clues come too fast or are too easy, the players will get bored or simply sit back and enjoy the game master unrolling the plot for them.  If the clues are too hard to find, the players will become frustrated and spend their energy following dead ends.  InSpectres deals with this problem by allowing the players to invent their own clues. The game mechanics regulate the flow of clues to give the players time to develop their ideas and come up with an interesting story.

InSpectres uses an adversarial system, in which the player describes what happens if the dice roll is successful and the game master decides if the dice roll is bad. However, like most role playing games, the game has a method of conflict resolution using dice. If the player succeeds, they earn a "franchise die," and when enough are collected, the current case is solved. Players can, at any time, use "confessionals," in the style of reality television, to add traits to other players' characters or steer events their way.

Setting 
The player characters have just started a franchise in the supernatural investigation and elimination company, InSpectres. They investigate paranormal phenomena, hunt ghosts and kill vampires, depending on their company's niche.

Supplements 
Three pdf supplements (termed 'micro-supplements') have been released which present alternative settings for the InSpectres game.  All three micro supplements are available for free download.

InSpeckers
With this supplement, you'll be able to run In-Speckers: a series of
adventures where grade-schoolers across the country fight the forces of darkness in
their homes, schools and neighborhoods.

UnSpeakable
An InSpectres micro-supplement of horror, madness, and mystery.  This micro-supplement is written to accommodate weird tales of horror,
madness and woe in the vein of H.P. Lovecraft. The basic play structure is that of InSpectres except flavored with a 1920s setting.
Rather than agents working out of a company, the characters are people who have
been called together to investigate the unknown.

InSpace
This supplement lets you explore the mysteries of space and play games in the style of 2001: A Space Odyssey, Solaris, Contact, Ringworld, or Forbidden Planet.

Other media 
InSpectres inspired a feature-length film from Reactor 88 Studios. The official release date was September 6, 2013, with the film premiering at an initial theatrical release by Muvico in Rosemont, Illinois and in December at CineFamily in Los Angeles.

Notes

External links 
 InSpectres homepage
 InSpectres movie site
 IMDB page
 InSpeckers Supplement
  UnSpeakable Supplement
 InSpace Supplement
Indie role-playing games
Comedy role-playing games
Horror role-playing games
Role-playing games introduced in 2002